Metrobates trux is a species of water strider in the family Gerridae. It is found in North America.

Subspecies
These two subspecies belong to the species Metrobates trux:
 Metrobates trux infuscatus Usinger, 1953
 Metrobates trux trux (Torre-Bueno, 1921)

References

Trepobatinae
Articles created by Qbugbot
Insects described in 1921